Seattle–Tacoma International Airport , branded as SEA Airport and also referred to as Sea–Tac, is the primary commercial airport serving the Seattle metropolitan area in the U.S. state of Washington. The airport, which is the busiest in the Pacific Northwest region of North America, is situated between Portland, Oregon and Vancouver, British Columbia, and is owned by Port of Seattle.

The airport has flights to cities throughout North America, Oceania, Europe, the Middle East, and Asia. It is the primary hub for Alaska Airlines, whose headquarters are near the airport. It is also a hub and international gateway for Delta Air Lines, which has expanded at the airport since 2011. , 31 airlines operate at SEA, serving 91 domestic and 28 international destinations.

History
The airport was built by the Port of Seattle in 1944 after the U.S. military took control of Boeing Field in World War II. The Port received $1 million from the Civil Aeronautics Administration to build the airport and $100,000 from the City of Tacoma. The first scheduled airline flights were Northwest and Trans-Canada in 1947; Western and United moved from Boeing Field in the next couple of years, and Pan Am moved in 1952–53, but West Coast and successors Air West and Hughes Airwest stayed at Boeing Field until 1971. The original terminal was designed by architect Herman A. Moldenhour. The official opening ceremony took place on July 9, 1947, in front of a crowd of 30,000.

Runway 34 was lengthened to 7500 ft in 1951, to 8500 ft by 1958, and to 11900 ft by 1962. The extension required the construction of an automobile tunnel for South 188th Street, which opened in July 1961. Runway 34L replaced runway 2 around 1970.

The April 1957 OAG shows 216 departures a week on United, 80 Northwest, 35 Western, 21 Trans-Canada, 20 Pan Am, 20 Pacific Northern and 10 Alaska. The first jet flights were Pan Am Boeing 707s to Honolulu via Portland (OR) in late 1959 (Pan Am's timetable for September 27 shows a weekly jet). In 1966 Scandinavian Airlines began the airport's first non-stop flight to mainland Europe (Pan Am nonstops to London began around 1961). The first concourse opened in July 1959.

The one-story South Concourse (now Concourse A) opened in 1961, adding another  to the length of the airport. It added eight gate positions, bringing the total to 19, a  area housing international arrivals and the offices of U.S. Customs, Immigration, Public Health and the Department of Agriculture. Concourse C opened in July 1966. Just four years later, it was extended to include another 10 gates, bringing the total to 35. The Port embarked on a major expansion plan, designed by The Richardson Associates and lasting from 1967 to 1973, adding a second runway, a parking garage, two satellite terminals and other improvements. In 1973, $28-million new terminal was built over and around the 1949 structure; the new terminal quadrupled the area for public use. On July 1, 1973, the Airport opened two new satellite terminals, along with an underground train system to connect them to the Main Terminal. These fully automatic shuttle trains were the first of their kind in the United States. Also unprecedented in any U.S. airport: as part of the expansion the Port commissioned $300,000 worth of artworks; these were the start of what would become a large public art collection owned by the Port. In the mid-1980s, the Main Terminal was renovated and another  was added to the north end. Concourse D was expanded in 1987 with a rotunda that added four new gates. In 1993, Concourses B, C, and D were renovated.

Residents of the surrounding area filed lawsuits against the Port in the early 1970s, complaining of noise, vibration, smoke, and other problems. The Port and the government of King County adopted the Sea–Tac Communities Plan in 1976 to address problems and guide future development. The Port spent more than $100 million over the next decade to buy homes and school buildings in the vicinity, and soundproof others nearby. In the mid-1980s, the airport participated in the airport noise-compatibility program initiated by Congress in 1979. Airport-noise contours were developed, real estate was purchased and some homes were retrofitted to achieve noise mitigation.

In 1978 the U.S. ended airline regulation, and the U.S. airlines were allowed to determine routes and fares without government approval. Deregulation resulted in some new service to Seattle, including from TWA, then the fourth-largest U.S. airline, as well as Delta, National, and American.

After the death of U.S. Senator Henry Martin "Scoop" Jackson in 1983, the Seattle Port Commission voted to change the airport's name to the Henry M. Jackson International Airport. Citizens of Tacoma interpreted the change as an insult to their community—the second time in the airport's history that the port authorities had attempted to remove "Tacoma" from the name. The $100,000 Tacoma had provided for the airport's construction during World War II had come with an explicit promise that the city would be included in the airport's name. An additional complicating factor was the existence of another Jackson International Airport (now Jackson–Medgar Wiley Evers International Airport) in Jackson, Mississippi, whose management threatened legal action to preserve its exclusive use of the name. The controversy was resolved after polls of Seattle and Tacoma area residents showed their preference for the original name by margins as much as 5:1. Helen Jackson, the widow of the late Senator Henry M. Jackson, expressed her desire that their family remain neutral in the debate. With a 3–2 vote of the Port of Seattle Commission, the name reverted to Seattle–Tacoma International Airport in early 1984.

In the late 1980s the Port of Seattle and a council representing local county governments considered the future of air traffic in the region and predicted that the airport could reach capacity by 2000. In 1992, the planning committee concluded that the best solution was to add a third runway to the airport and construct a supplemental two-runway airport in one of the neighboring counties. Members of the community opposed a third runway, as did the Highline School District and the cities of Des Moines, Burien, Federal Way, Tukwila, and Normandy Park, but a 1994 study concluded there were no feasible sites for an additional airport. The Port of Seattle approved a plan for the new runway in 1996, prompting a lawsuit from opponents. The Port secured the necessary permits by agreeing to noise reduction programs and environmental protections. Runway opponents appealed these permits, but dropped their challenges in 2004.

Recent years
The airport's Central Terminal building was renovated and expanded in 2003 in a project designed by Curtis W. Fentress, of Fentress Architects.

The third runway opened on November 20, 2008, with a construction cost of $1.1 billion. Parallel to the existing two, the new runway is 2500 ft west of runway 34R, allowing landings on both in times of low visibility. The older runways are 800 ft apart, too close to allow use of both in low visibility.

In 2014, Delta Air Lines announced plans to expand Seattle into a transpacific hub. Since then, Delta has added numerous international flights and dozens of domestic flights to feed those services. Delta's increased presence in Seattle has been seen by some industry analysts as a response to United Airlines' transpacific hub at San Francisco, as well as Delta's disenchantment with its former Tokyo–Narita hub.

In late 2021, shortly after Alaska Airlines joined American Airlines in the Oneworld alliance, American began establishing a hub at the airport to serve destinations in the Asia Pacific region.

The North Satellite Terminal only received limited upgrades since it opened in 1973, and needed modernization. The Port of Seattle initially looked at simply updating the terminal in a project it called the North Satellite Renovation Plan (NorthSTAR). In 2016, the Port announced it would also significantly expand the terminal. The $550 million project called the North Satellite Modernization increased the size of the North Satellite by 201,000 square feet and another eight gates, bringing the total to 20. The second phase modernized the remaining areas of the old terminal and expands dining and retail space around the twenty existing gates. The new terminal opened on June 29, 2021.

In 2022, the Port of Seattle completed a new 450,000-square-foot International Arrivals Facility (IAF) east of Concourse A, along with a 900-foot-long high bridge that will take passengers from the South Satellite, up 85 feet above the existing taxiway and over the top of Concourse A. The project was initially expected to be completed by 2021 at a cost of $766 million., though revised to $968 million in late 2018. The old customs and immigration facility was located in the basement of the South Satellite, and operated well over its design capacity. Additionally, the process for passengers was complicated by the satellite's isolated location. With the opening of the new IAF, Concourse A will now also be used for arriving international flights, nearly doubling the number of gates capable of serving arriving international passengers. With the opening of the IAF, the Port of Seattle will renovate the South Satellite Terminal.

Future
SEA Airport has seen record growth in passenger traffic over the last few years. That growth has been partly fueled by the nationwide expansion of Seattle-based Alaska Airlines and by Delta Air Lines setting up a major international hub at SEA Airport. That growth has strained the airport's facilities and led the port to invest more than $2 billion into several expansion and renovation projects.

SEA Airport has six outbound baggage handling systems with limited to no cross-connectivity. The system now in place is aging and reaching its maximum capacity. This $320.4 million project will create one unified, high-speed baggage system under the airport. That will allow bags to be checked from any ticketing counter, to receive security screening faster, and to be routed to any gate in the airport. The extra efficiency and speed will allow the airport to handle more baggage in the future without expanding the footprint of the baggage handling systems. The initial phase of the project was finished in 2018 and the entire system will be in place by 2023.

With estimates that the Puget Sound region will grow by another one million people by 2035, the Port of Seattle began developing the Sustainable Airport Master Plan (SAMP) in 2018 to meet passenger and cargo demands. The SAMP recommends more than 30 projects to improve efficiency and airport access, including a new terminal with 19 gates and an automated people mover through three separate stations. More future projects that are in progress or will begin later are an automated parking garage guidance system, expansion of Concourse C, roadway improvements throughout the airport, Checkpoint 1 relocation, a gateway project in cooperation with Alaska Airlines, restroom renovations, Concourse A building expansion for lounges, improved curbside safety and accessibility, continued refurbishment of the Central Terminal, and a replacement of controls pertaining to the SEA Underground shuttles.

Facilities

Terminals

SEA has 103 gates in four concourses and two satellite buildings. The two satellite terminal buildings, named the North and South Satellites, are connected to the four concourses in the main terminal by a three-line automated people mover system called the SEA Underground. The underground transit system moves passengers within the four concourses of the central terminal and out to the two satellite terminals. All non-precleared international arrivals arrive at the South Satellite or Concourse A, regardless of their departure terminal.

 Concourse A contains 16 gates.
 Concourse B contains 17 gates.
 Concourse C contains 27 gates.
 Concourse D contains 17 gates.
 North Satellite contains 20 gates.
 South Satellite contains 14 gates.

Airfield

In 2018, the airport averaged 1,233 aircraft operations per day, 99% being commercial flights, 1% air taxi operations, and less than 1% transient general aviation and military.

A new control tower was built beginning in 2001 and opened in November 2004, at the cost of $26 million. The cab has  of space and was designed to support operation by ten controllers, with possible future expansion up to 15. The site and construction method of the tower were designed to maximize the visibility and efficacy of radar systems. The airport's original control tower, built in the 1950s, is now part of the passenger terminal and used as a ramp control tower after being repaired from damage caused by the 2001 Nisqually earthquake.

A recurring problem at the airport is the misidentification of the westernmost taxiway, Taxiway Tango, as a runway. A large "X" has been placed on the north end of the taxiway, but many aircraft have landed on the taxiway. The FAA issued an alert notice dated from August 27, 2009, to September 24, 2009, urging airplanes about taking precautions such as REILs and other visual cues while landing from the north.

In 2007, the airport became the first to implement an avian radar system providing 24-hour monitoring of wildlife activity across the airfield. This pilot program, designed and implemented with the assistance of the University of Illinois Center of Excellence for Airport Technology (CEAT), was intended to decrease potentially fatal incidents involving collisions with birds and to provide a test bed for the implementation of the technology in the US, which was expected to begin in 2009. The technology is part of a strategy to reduce the presence of wildlife on the airfield.

The Seattle office of the National Weather Service operates a weather station at the airport, with a temperature gauge between the center and eastern runways. The airport has served as Seattle's official weather recording location since 1945.

Ground transportation

The site of SEA Airport was chosen partly due to its location along State Route 99, approximately midway between Seattle and Tacoma. Interstate 5 and Interstate 405 also converge near the airport, with an easy connection to the airport via State Route 518 and the Airport Expressway. State Route 509 runs west of the airport, connecting the area to West Seattle. The airport is the largest generator of vehicle trips in the state.

The Port of Seattle offers paid on-site parking in a 12,100-space garage, notable for being North America's largest parking structure under one roof. The airport also offers valet parking and electric vehicle charging stations. Several privately owned parking facilities are located off-site near the airport with shuttle access.

The airport is served by the 1 Line of Sound Transit's Link light rail system at the SeaTac/Airport station with frequent service to downtown Seattle and the University of Washington. The station opened on December 19, 2009, and is connected to the airport terminal via a pedestrian bridge to the airport parking garage. Another pedestrian bridge over International Boulevard is used to access the city of SeaTac, nearby airport hotels, and King County Metro buses including RapidRide A Line. A 1.6-mile light rail extension south to Angle Lake station at South 200th Street opened on September 24, 2016.

The airport is also served both by the King County Metro bus system and Sound Transit regional express buses. Sound Transit buses offer service to West Seattle, White Center, Burien, Renton, Newcastle and Bellevue through Route 560. In contrast, Route 574 offers service to Lakewood via Des Moines, Federal Way, and Tacoma.

Tukwila Station, which is approximately 5 miles east of the airport, is served by Sounder commuter rail and Amtrak Cascades regional inter-city rail with service north to Vancouver, Canada, and service south to Portland and Eugene in Oregon. This station can be reached in about 30 minutes via the Central Link light rail or the RapidRide A Line bus service and transferring at Tukwila International Boulevard station to the RapidRide F Line bus service.

The airport serves door-to-door shuttle services (Shuttle Express and Speedi Shuttle) and several scheduled airporter bus services. Airporters include Bellair Charters to Yakima and Bellingham, and the Quick Shuttle to downtown Vancouver, Canada, through Quick Shuttle, with other pick-up stops at downtown Seattle, Bellingham International Airport, and drop-off stops just inside the Canadian–U.S. boundary and at the Vancouver International Airport.

Taxis, limousines, and transportation network companies (Lyft, Uber and Wingz) are also available. Prior to 2019, the Port of Seattle contracted out taxi services to an independent company, but changed to direct management with drivers due to protests over high access fees. , the airport has 409 taxi drivers who are part of the Teamsters Local 117 labor union.

A  consolidated rental car facility opened on May 17, 2012. The facility is at the northeastern portion of the airport at the intersection of South 160th Street and International Boulevard South. The facility has 5,400 parking spaces and can handle up to 14,000 transactions per day. After the opening of the facility, 3,200 parking spaces in the central parking structure opened for general use. Passengers reach the facility on a five-minute trip aboard one of 29 low-floor Gillig CNG buses. Previously, only Alamo, Avis, Sixt, Budget, Hertz and National had cars on site. Advantage, Dollar, Enterprise, Thrifty, EZ Rent-A-Car and Fox Rent A Car ran shuttles to off-site locations. , Rent-a-Wreck was the last remaining company to not relocate to the consolidated facility and continue using their own shuttles.

Airlines and destinations

Passenger

Cargo

Statistics

Top destinations

Airline market share

Annual traffic

Accidents and incidents
 November 30, 1947: Alaska Airlines Flight 9, a Douglas C-54A en route to Seattle from Anchorage, Alaska, landed in heavy fog and damp conditions after failed attempts at nearby Boeing Field and Paine Field in Everett. Shortly before 2:30 p.m. on Sunday, the plane touched down  beyond the approach area to runway 20 and sped onto a nearby road, colliding with an automobile and bursting into flames. Nine fatalities resulted from the accident, including a blind woman riding in the car.
 April 2, 1956: Northwest Orient Airlines Flight 2, a Boeing 377 Stratocruiser headed to Portland International Airport in Portland, Oregon and points east, experienced reduced power and extreme buffeting shortly after takeoff from runway 20 due to an improper setting of the airplane's cowl flaps by the flight engineer. Plans were initially made to land at McChord Air Force Base, but the pilot was forced to make a water landing in Puget Sound east of Maury Island. The plane sank within 15 minutes; five of the 38 on board died.
 November 24, 1971: Northwest Airlines Flight 305, a Boeing 727 flying to SEA Airport from Portland International Airport, was hijacked by a man calling himself "Dan Cooper", later misidentified by the press as "D. B. Cooper". Cooper released the passengers after landing in exchange for $200,000 and four parachutes, ordered the plane back into the air and jumped out over Southwest Washington with the money. To this day, neither Cooper nor most of the $200,000 have been found.
 December 26, 1974: Harbor Airlines Flight 308, a Britten Norman Islander bound for Oak Harbor crashed 1 km north of SEA Airport in snowy weather conditions into Riverton. Four of the six occupants on board (3 passengers, 1 crew) were killed. Unknown matter in the pitot tubes caused improper readings of the airspeed indicator.
 January 20, 1983: Northwest Airlines Flight 608, a Boeing 727 flying from SEA Airport to Portland, was hijacked. The man told a flight attendant that he had a bomb and demanded to be taken to Afghanistan. Federal agents stormed the plane after it landed in Portland for refueling. The hijacker was killed and the box he carried revealed no explosives.
 April 15, 1988: Horizon Air Flight 2658, a twin-engine de Havilland Canada Dash-8 departing for Spokane International Airport, experienced a power loss in the number two engine shortly after takeoff. While the crew lowered the gear for landing as they returned to the airport, a massive fire broke out in the right engine nacelle, resulting in a loss of braking and directional control. After touchdown, the aircraft veered off the runway and crossed the ramp, colliding with two jetways before coming to a stop against a third. The aircraft was destroyed by fire on impact. Four of the 37 passengers were seriously injured, but there were no fatalities.
 August 10, 2018: An empty Horizon Air Bombardier Q400 was stolen and ultimately crashed on Ketron Island.

References

External links

 
 Seattle–Tacoma International Airport at WSDOT Aviation
 HistoryLink.org Online Encyclopedia of Washington State History – Detailed articles on the history of the airport
 
 
 

 
Airports in King County, Washington
Seattle metropolitan area
Economy of Seattle
Economy of Tacoma, Washington
Art Deco airports
Airports established in 1944
1944 establishments in Washington (state)
Airport
Port of Seattle